Peter Alphonsus Hannan (18 October 1908 – 4 May 1938) was an Australian rules footballer who played with Melbourne and Footscray in the Victorian Football League (VFL).

Family
The son of William Michael Hannan, and Mary Hannan (-1944), née Breene, Peter Alphonsus Hannan was born at Seymour, Victoria on 18 October 1908.

Death
He died at his parents' house in Kew at the age of 29 in May 1938.

Notes

References

External links 
 
 
 Peter Hannan at The VFA Project.
 Peter Hannan at Demonwiki.

1908 births
1938 deaths
Australian rules footballers from Victoria (Australia)
Melbourne Football Club players
Western Bulldogs players
Yarraville Football Club players
Prahran Football Club players